Marc Garanger (May 2, 1935 – April 28, 2020) was a French photographer.

Life 
Garanger was born in 1935 in Ézy-sur-Eure, France and died on April 28, 2020, just six days before his 85th birthday.

Career 
He was most famous for his photography of Algerian women in the 1960s. He was a winner of the 1966 Niépce Prize in photography.

References

External links

French photographers
1935 births
2020 deaths